Aristakes may refer to:

St. Aristaces I, son of Gregory the Illuminator
Aristakes Lastivertsi, medieval Armenian historian and chronicler